Sead Kolašinac (born 20 June 1993) is a Bosnian professional footballer who plays as a left-back for Ligue 1 club Marseille and the Bosnia and Herzegovina national team.

Kolašinac started his professional career at Schalke 04, playing first in its reserve team, before joining Arsenal in 2017. In 2021, he was loaned back to Schalke 04. The following year, he moved to Marseille.

A former German youth international, Kolašinac made his senior international debut for Bosnia and Herzegovina in 2013, earning over 50 caps since. He represented the nation at their first major championship, the 2014 FIFA World Cup.

Club career

Schalke 04

Kolašinac started playing football at his hometown club Karlsruher SC, which he joined in 2001. In 2009, he moved to 1899 Hoffenheim. A year later, he switched to VfB Stuttgart. In January 2011, he went to Schalke 04. He made his professional debut against Greuther Fürth on 15 September 2012 at the age of 19. On 4 December, Kolašinac debuted in UEFA Champions League away at Montpellier.

In June 2013, he extended his contract until June 2017.

In August 2014, he suffered a severe knee injury, which was diagnosed as anterior cruciate ligament tear and was ruled out for at least six months. He returned to the pitch on 11 April 2015, over seven months after the injury.

On 13 December 2015, he scored his first professional goal against FC Augsburg.

Arsenal

In June 2017, Kolašinac signed a five-year deal with English side Arsenal.

2017–18 season
He made his official debut for the club in 2017 FA Community Shield against Chelsea on 6 August, managed to score a goal and win his first trophy. A week later, he made his league debut against Leicester City.

In September 2017, he was voted Arsenal's Player of the Month for August.

On 28 October, he scored his first league goal for the team in a triumph over Swansea City.

He was once again voted Arsenal's Player of the Month, this time for October.

2018–19 season
In August 2018, Kolašinac picked up a knee injury during pre-season game against Chelsea, which ruled him out for the start of season. He made his season debut in UEFA Europa League game against Qarabağ on 4 October.

2019–20 season
Kolašinac played his first game of the campaign in a defeat of Burnley on 17 August 2019.

On 15 July 2020, he played his 100th game for the side against Liverpool.

2020–21 season
Kolašinac appeared in his first game of the season on 19 September against West Ham United.

In January 2021, he was sent on a six-month loan to his former club Schalke 04. He played his first competitive game for the team since coming back on 9 January against 1899 Hoffenheim. On 27 February, he scored first goal for Schalke 04 since his comeback in a victory over VfB Stuttgart.

2021–22 season
Kolašinac debuted in the season against Manchester City on 28 August 2021.

In November, he suffered an ankle injury, which was diagnosed as broken ankle and was ruled out for at least two months.

Marseille
In January 2022, Kolašinac moved to French outfit Marseille on a contract until June 2023. He debuted officially for the team on 4 February against Angers. On 13 November, he scored his first goal for Marseille against Monaco, which secured the victory for his side.

International career
Despite representing Germany at various youth levels, Kolašinac decided to play for Bosnia and Herzegovina at senior level.

In November 2013, his request to change sports citizenship from German to Bosnian was approved by FIFA. Later that month, he received his first senior call-up, for a friendly game against Argentina, and debuted in that game on 18 November.

In June 2014, Kolašinac was named in Bosnia and Herzegovina's squad for 2014 FIFA World Cup, country's first major competition. He made his tournament debut in the opening group match against Argentina on 15 June.

Style of play
During his career, Kolašinac has been deployed as a centre-back and as a defensive midfielder, although he spent most of the time playing as a left-back. He possesses very strong body build and strength.

Media
Kolašinac was involved in the Amazon Original sports docuseries All or Nothing: Arsenal, which documented the club by spending time with the coaching staff and players behind the scenes both on and off the field throughout their 2021–22 season.

Personal life
Kolašinac married his long-time girlfriend Susubelle in June 2019. Together they have a daughter named Soleil.

He is a practising Muslim; along with international teammates Ibrahim Šehić, Muhamed Bešić, Armin Hodžić, Izet Hajrović, Edin Višća and Ervin Zukanović he visited a mosque in Zenica during national team concentration.

In July 2019, he and his then teammate Mesut Özil were victims of an attempted carjacking, which Kolašinac successfully fought off.

Career statistics

Club

International

Honours
Arsenal
FA Cup: 2019–20
FA Community Shield: 2017, 2020

References

External links

1993 births
Living people
Footballers from Karlsruhe
German people of Bosnia and Herzegovina descent
Citizens of Bosnia and Herzegovina through descent
German footballers
Germany youth international footballers
German expatriate footballers
Bosnia and Herzegovina footballers
Bosnia and Herzegovina international footballers
Bosnia and Herzegovina expatriate footballers
Association football fullbacks
FC Schalke 04 II players
FC Schalke 04 players
Arsenal F.C. players
Olympique de Marseille players
Regionalliga players
Bundesliga players
Premier League players
Ligue 1 players
Expatriate footballers in England
Expatriate footballers in France
German expatriate sportspeople in England
German expatriate sportspeople in France
Bosnia and Herzegovina expatriate sportspeople in Germany
Bosnia and Herzegovina expatriate sportspeople in England
Bosnia and Herzegovina expatriate sportspeople in France
2014 FIFA World Cup players
FA Cup Final players